Miller–Southside Residential Historic District is a national historic district located at Blacksburg, Montgomery County, Virginia.  The district encompasses 165 contributing buildings in a predominantly residential section of the town of Blacksburg. The residences date between 1909 and 1941, and are in a variety of popular architectural styles including American Foursquare, Bungalow, and Colonial Revival.

It was listed on the National Register of Historic Places in 1991.

References

Historic districts in Montgomery County, Virginia
Colonial Revival architecture in Virginia
National Register of Historic Places in Montgomery County, Virginia
Blacksburg, Virginia
Historic districts on the National Register of Historic Places in Virginia